Keratin 3  also known as cytokeratin 3 is a protein that in humans is encoded by the KRT3 gene. Keratin 3 is a type II cytokeratin.  It is specifically found in the corneal epithelium together with keratin 12.

Mutations in the KRT3 encoding this protein have been associated with Meesmanns Corneal Dystrophy.

References 

Keratins